Sun Qingmei (born June 19, 1966) is a Chinese former footballer who played for the China national team at the 1991 and 1995 editions of the FIFA Women's World Cup and won a silver medal at the 1996 Atlanta Olympics.

Club career

During her childhood in Hebei, Sun's parents locked her in her bedroom in a bid to stop her playing football. She was a member of the state track and field team when she started football training in 1983 and joined the Hebei club in 1984. After the 1991 Women's World Cup, Sun accepted a transfer to the Japan Women's Football League with Matsushita Denki. She helped the Takatsuki, Osaka-based team win the league title in the 1994 season.

International career

At the 1988 FIFA Women's Invitation Tournament in Guangdong she was part of the hosts' team who lost the third place play-off to Brazil. The Chinese press voted her into the tournament's official all-star team. At the 1991 FIFA Women's World Cup, Sun played the full 80 minutes in all four of China's games. The hosts reached the quarter-finals before losing 1–0 to Sweden. In the first ever FIFA Women's World Cup match, Sun scored the fourth goal in China's 4–0 win over eventual finalists Norway on 16 November 1991.

In 1996 Sun won the Olympic silver medal with the Chinese team. She played all five matches and scored three goals. She retired from football after helping China retain the AFC Women's Asian Cup at the 1997 AFC Women's Championship in December 1997.

International goals

References

External links

 
Profile

1966 births
Living people
Chinese women's footballers
Chinese expatriate footballers
China women's international footballers
Olympic footballers of China
Footballers at the 1996 Summer Olympics
Olympic silver medalists for China
1995 FIFA Women's World Cup players
Olympic medalists in football
1991 FIFA Women's World Cup players
Asian Games medalists in football
Footballers at the 1990 Asian Games
Footballers at the 1994 Asian Games
Medalists at the 1996 Summer Olympics
Sportspeople from Handan
Speranza Osaka-Takatsuki players
Nadeshiko League players
Expatriate women's footballers in Japan
Asian Games gold medalists for China
Women's association football forwards
Medalists at the 1990 Asian Games
Medalists at the 1994 Asian Games
FIFA Century Club